Nhlanhla Shabalala (born 16 December 1985) is a South African former football player who played as a midfielder. He played for Ajax Cape Town, AmaZulu and Moroka Swallows.

References

1985 births
Living people
People from Mafube Local Municipality
Soccer players from the Free State (province)
Zulu people
South African soccer players
Association football midfielders
Cape Town Spurs F.C. players
AmaZulu F.C. players
Moroka Swallows F.C. players